This article is the list of short film series since the inception of filmmaking in the 19th century.

19th century

1890s

20th century

1910s

1920s

1930s

1940s

1950s

1960s

1970s

1980s

1990s

21st century

2000s

2010s

2020s

See also
 Lists of feature film series
 List of animated short film series

References

Series
shorts